Vangueria cistifolia is a species of flowering plant in the family Rubiaceae. It is found in Angola and Zambia.

Taxonomy
There are 2 varieties:
V. cistifolia var. cistifolia
V. cistifolia var. latifolia (Verdc.) Lantz

References

External links
 World Checklist of Rubiaceae

Flora of Angola
Flora of Zambia
cistifolia